Scarabaeus erichsoni, is a species of dung beetle found in India, and Sri Lanka. Sometimes, the species is classified as Kheper erichsoni.

Description
This broadly oval, flat species has an average length of about 21 to 26 mm. Body with dark blue, green or coppery dorsum and darker ventrum. Head, legs and lateral margins of the thorax covered with dark hair. Body scattered shiny, and very strongly punctured. Head coarsely, densely, and rugosely pitted. Pronotum scarcely convex. Scutellum is visible and the elytra rather deeply striate. Pygidium rather finely punctured. In male, middle part of the fringe on the upper surface of the hind tibia is very close, but in female, it is evenly spaced and rather thin.

References

Scarabaeinae
Insects of Sri Lanka
Insects of India
Insects described in 1867